The 2021–22 Cal Poly Mustangs men's basketball team represented California Polytechnic State University in the 2021–22 NCAA Division I men's basketball season. The Mustangs, led by third-year head coach John Smith, played their home games at the Robert A. Mott Athletics Center in San Luis Obispo, California, and competed as members of the Big West Conference.

Previous season

Roster

Source:

Schedule and results

|-
!colspan=12 style=| Exhibition

|-
!colspan=12 style=| Non-conference regular season

|-
!colspan=12 style=| Big West regular season

|-
!colspan=12 style=| Big West tournament

Sources:

Notes

References

Cal Poly Mustangs men's basketball seasons
Cal Poly Mustangs
Cal Poly Mustangs men's basketball
Cal Poly Mustangs men's basketball